Pope Theodoros may refer to:

 Pope Theodoros I of Alexandria, ruled in 730–742
 Pope Tawadros II of Alexandria, ruled since 2012